The Club Deportivo Mineros de Zacatecas Premier played in the Liga Premier in Zacatecas City, Zacatecas, Mexico and were the official reserve team for Mineros de Zacatecas.

Players

Current squad

References

External links

Football clubs in Zacatecas
Mexican reserve football clubs
Association football clubs established in 2015
2015 establishments in Mexico
Liga Premier de México